Thomas Linehan (–1938) was an Irish politician. He was a member of Seanad Éireann from 1922 to 1936. He was first elected to the Seanad in 1922 as a Farmers' Party candidate. He was re-elected at the 1925 Seanad election for 12 years and served until the Free State Seanad was abolished in 1936. He was an independent member from 1928 onwards.

Linehan was born in County Cork and farmed for many years at Ballinvarrig House, Whitechurch, County Cork, where he died on 15 October 1938 aged 79. He was the first secretary of the Land League (Conradh na Talun) in the county, Vice-Chairman of the County Council and a President and trustee of the Irish Farmers' Union.

References

1859 births
1938 deaths
Farmers' Party (Ireland) senators
Members of the 1922 Seanad
Members of the 1925 Seanad
Members of the 1928 Seanad
Members of the 1931 Seanad
Members of the 1934 Seanad
People from County Cork
Irish farmers
Independent members of Seanad Éireann